Arden railway station is a railway station currently under construction as part of the Metro Tunnel project. It will be served by the Sunbury, Pakenham and Cranbourne lines. It will be built in North Melbourne, below Laurens and Arden Streets, using the cut-and-cover method. Major construction commenced in April 2018.

Location
Arden Street was chosen as the site for a new railway station to support the expansion of the central city and provide a focus for the development of a new commercial, residential and activity centre in North Melbourne. 

The Victorian government has stated that Arden station will support job creation by improving public transport access to inner-west Melbourne, an area which has been earmarked for urban renewal. Fifty-six hectares of land around the proposed Arden station, much of which is owned by the State Government, is earmarked for revitalisation as part of the project. The new suburb is expected to house around 15,000 people and provide 34,000 jobs.

The Arden Station location will also play a key role in supporting the construction of the western section of the Metro Tunnel, as it houses many important facilities such as a concrete batching facility, offices, and storage areas for concrete segments. Tunnel boring machines were launched towards the western tunnel entrance in Kensington from this location in 2019.

Naming
Following a state government-led naming competition, it was announced that the new station was to be named North Melbourne upon its completion, with the existing North Melbourne railway station to be renamed West Melbourne. However, after a number of security and logistical concerns relating to renaming the existing North Melbourne station became apparent, the government announced that it had decided to retain the station's working name of Arden.

Station layout

Design
The station's external design, made out of clay brick, will reflect the area's industrial heritage. A café will be included in the station, with areas for outdoor dining. New public gathering space will provide space for locals and passengers to enjoy. As the station may be prone to flooding, drainage at the station has been designed to capture the natural flow of rainwater and distribute it into nearby garden beds.

Arden Precinct
The Metro Tunnel is set to transform the Arden precinct, with around 6000 square metres of public gathering space likely to be created. As the area is also prone to flooding, the flood-resistant “urban sponge” landscape strategy will be used to absorb stormwater. This will include rain gardens, tree planters and permeable paving. Nearby streets such as Laurens and Barwise Street will be upgraded to be more pedstrian-oriented.

References

Proposed railway stations in Melbourne
Railway stations scheduled to open in 2025
Railway stations located underground in Melbourne
Railway stations in the City of Melbourne (LGA)